Apterichtus caecus, the European finless eel, is a species of snake eel native to the eastern Atlantic Ocean, from the Azores to the Gulf of Guinea, and into the western Mediterranean including the Balearic Islands. It can be found on the continental shelf at depths of from  living in burrows in mud or sand.  It preys on other fishes as well as benthic invertebrates.  Spawning for this species in the Mediterranean has been recorded in the early summer months of May and June.  This species can reach a length of  TL.

References

caecus
Fish described in 1758
Taxa named by Carl Linnaeus